Parkinson's law is the observation that public administration, bureaucracy and officialdom expands, regardless of the amount of work to be done.  This was attributed mainly to two factors: that officials want subordinates, not rivals, and that officials make work for each other.

It was first published in 1955 by the naval historian, C. Northcote Parkinson, as an essay in The Economist.  He gave, as examples, the growth in the size of the British Admiralty and Colonial Office even though the numbers of their ships and colonies were declining.

The growth was presented mathematically with the formula x=(2km+P)/n in which k was the number of officlals wanting subordinates, m was the hours they spent writing minutes to each other and so on.

The essay was then published with other similar essays as a successful book: Parkinson's Law: The Pursuit of Progress.  It was translated into many languages as the law seemed to apply in other countries too.

History
Articulated by Cyril Northcote Parkinson as part of the first sentence of an essay published in The Economist in 1955 and since republished online, it was reprinted with other essays in the book Parkinson's Law: The Pursuit of Progress (London, John Murray, 1958). He derived the dictum from his extensive experience in the British Civil Service.

A current form of the law is not the one to which Parkinson referred by that name in the article, but rather a mathematical equation describing the rate at which bureaucracies expand over time. Much of the essay is dedicated to a summary of purportedly scientific observations supporting the law, such as the increase in the number of employees at the Colonial Office while the British Empire declined (he showed that it had its greatest number of staff when it was folded into the Foreign Office due to a lack of colonies to administer). He explained this growth using two forces: (1) "An official wants to multiply subordinates, not rivals," and (2) "Officials make work for each other." He noted that the number employed in a bureaucracy rose by 5–7% per year "irrespective of any variation in the amount of work (if any) to be done."

Parkinson's Law was translated into many languages. It was highly popular in the Soviet Union and its sphere of influence. In 1986, Alessandro Natta complained about the swelling bureaucracy in Italy. Mikhail Gorbachev responded that "Parkinson's law works everywhere."

Corollaries

The first-referenced meaning of the law has dominated, and sprouted several corollaries, the best known being the Stock–Sanford corollary to Parkinson's law:

Other corollaries include Horstman's corollary to Parkinson's law, coined by Mark Horstman of website manager-tools.com:

the Asimov corollary to Parkinson's law:

as well as corollaries relating to computers, such as:

Generalization
The law can be generalized further as:

An extension is often added:

This generalization has come to resemble what some economists regard as the law of demand – namely, the lower the price of a service or commodity, the greater the quantity demanded. This is also referred to as induced demand.

Formula 
Observing that the promotion of employees necessitated the hiring of subordinates, and that time used answering minutes requires more work; Parkinson states: "In any public administrative department not actually at war the staff increase may be expected to follow this formula" (for a given year) 

x – number of new employees to be hired annually
k – number of employees who want to be promoted by hiring new employees
m – number of working hours per person for the preparation of internal memoranda (micropolitics)
P – difference: age at hiring − age at retirement
n – number of administrative files actually completed

Related efficiency
Parkinson also proposed a rule about the efficiency of administrative councils. He defined a "coefficient of inefficiency" with the number of members as the main determining variable. This is a semi-humorous attempt to define the size at which a committee or other decision-making body becomes completely inefficient.

In  a chapter is devoted to the basic question of what he called comitology: how committees, government cabinets, and other such bodies are created and eventually grow irrelevant (or are initially designed as such). (The word comitology has recently been independently invented by the European Union for a different non-humorous meaning.)

Empirical evidence is drawn from historical and contemporary government cabinets. Most often, the minimal size of a state's most powerful and prestigious body is five members. From English history, Parkinson notes a number of bodies that lost power as they grew:
 The first cabinet was the Council of the Crown, now the House of Lords, which grew from an unknown number to 29, to 50 before 1600, by which time it had lost much of its power.
 A new body was appointed in 1257, the "Lords of the King's Council", numbering fewer than 10. The body grew, and ceased to meet when it had 172 members.
 The third incarnation was the Privy Council, initially also numbering fewer than 10 members, rising to 47 in 1679.
 In 1715, the Privy Council lost power to the Cabinet Council with eight members, rising to 20 by 1725.
 Around 1740, the Cabinet Council was superseded by an inner group, called the Cabinet, initially with five members. At the time of Parkinson's study (the 1950s), the Cabinet was still the official governing body. Parkinson observed that, from 1939 on, there was an effort to save the Cabinet as an institution. The membership had been fluctuating from a high of 23 members in 1939, down to 18 in 1954.

A detailed mathematical expression is proposed by Parkinson for the coefficient of inefficiency, featuring many possible influences. In 2008, an attempt was made to empirically verify the proposed model. Parkinson's conjecture that membership exceeding a number "between 19.9 and 22.4" makes a committee manifestly inefficient seems well justified by the evidence proposed. Less certain is the optimal number of members, which must lie between three (a logical minimum) and 20. (Within a group of 20, individual discussions may occur, diluting the power of the leader.) That it may be eight seems arguable but is not supported by observation: no contemporary government in Parkinson's data set had eight members, and only the unfortunate king Charles I of England had a Committee of State of that size.

Other topics 
Other chapters relate to what time to arrive at a cocktail party, how best to select applicants, what is the best age to retire, and "injelitance": the disastrous rise to authority of individuals with an unusually high combination of incompetence and jealousy expressed in the chemical formula I3J5.

He also wrote the book Mrs. Parkinson's Law: and Other Studies in Domestic Science.

See also
 Dilbert principle
 Gustafson's law
 Hofstadter's law
 Lewis–Mogridge Position
 Induced demand
 Iron triangle
 Jevons paradox
 List of eponymous laws
 Parkinson's law of triviality
 Peter principle
 Planning fallacy
 SnackWell effect
 Student syndrome
 Time management
 Time to completion

References

Further reading
 .
 
 Planet Money Episode 877: "The Laws Of The Office", 21 November 2018, NPR

External links
 .
 .
 C. Northcote Parkinson, Parkinson's Law - extract (1958)

Adages
Fiscal policy
Law
Organizational theory
The Economist
Economics laws
Eponyms
Work